This is a list of flag bearers who have represented Switzerland at the Olympics.

Flag bearers carry the national flag of their country at the opening ceremony of the Olympic Games.

See also
Switzerland at the Olympics

References

Switzerland at the Olympics
Switzerland
Olympic flagbearers